Cristian Crăciun (born 16 November 1972) is a retired Romanian football player.

External links
 

1972 births
Living people
Sportspeople from Galați
Romanian footballers
Association football midfielders
FC Astra Giurgiu players
ASC Oțelul Galați players
Liga I players